Hell Has Harbour Views is a 2005 Australian television movie starring Matt Day and Lisa McCune. It was written and directed by Peter Duncan, based on the 2001 novel of the same name by Richard Beasley.

It was nominated for "best miniseries or telemovie" at both the AFI Awards and the Logie Awards, losing to The Incredible Journey of Mary Bryant at both; and for two additional AFI Awards and an additional Logie Award, all of which it lost to Love My Way.

Synopsis 
While successful and primed to continue ascending the company ladder, attorney Hugh Walker is guilt stricken by the people he and his company have hurt along the way. During a large case he meets the journalist Caroline and the two begin seeing each other, despite the fact that Hugh already has a girlfriend, Helen. Things grow more tense after he witnesses a sexual encounter in the office, placing him in the middle of office strife.

Cast
 Matt Day as Hugh Walker
 Lisa McCune as Caroline Ashton
 Marta Dusseldorp as Helen
 Tony Llewellyn-Jones as John Diplock
 Peter O'Brien as Tim Sullivan
 Steve Bisley as Bruce Kent
 Kris McQuade as Pam
 Frank Whitten as Giles Taffy QC
 Freya Stafford as Jill Bishop
 Abigail Bianca as Sarah
 David Field as Greg Hogan
 Roy Billing as Kevin Fields
 Tiriel Mora as Rob Carney
 Simon Chilvers as George Hancock
 Tony Barry as Frank Flannery

Reception 
The Sydney Morning Herald reviewed Hell Has Harbour Views, stating that it "never sets out to be Australian with a big A but it is sure to be a hot-ticket item with overseas buyers". The Age compared it favorably to other movies aired by ABC, as they felt that "After the bitter disappointments of recent ABC drama, Aunty has delivered the goods in this stylish and witty telemovie about one man's search for his soul in, of all places, the country's largest law firm."

Awards 

 AWGIE Awards (2005, won)

References

External links

2005 television films
2005 films
APRA Award winners
Australian television films
Television shows based on Australian novels
2005 in Australian television
Films directed by Peter Duncan